The Jones S-125 was a U.S. two-seat sport aircraft intended for large-scale production, though only one was completed.

Design and development

The Jones S-125 was a tidily presented, two-seat low-wing monoplane largely constructed from wood and with fabric covering. It was to have been offered with a choice of two modern, inverted inline engines, one a supercharged version of the other.

The wings were built around two box-spars, with roots carefully faired into the  fuselage. Beyond the roots the wing plan was trapezoidal out to rounded tips. The wings had significant dihedral, particularly on the lower surfaces. Modified Frise ailerons occupied about 70% of the trailing edges.

Its  Menasco C-4 or a  supercharged relative, the C-4S, were four-cylinder, air-cooled, inverted in-line engines, mounted on detachable, rubber-damped frames with fuel tanks in the wings. Aft, the cockpit seated two in tandem over the wing under a sliding, three-part, tunnel-type canopy. Normally the S-125 was flown from the rear seat, though the forward one was equipped for dual control. Its tail was conventional, with a roughly triangular tailplane on top of the fuselage. Its elevators had rounded tips, cut-outs for rudder movement and an internally adjustable trim tab port side. The fin had a blunted, cropped triangular profile and the rudder, which reached down to the keel, was largely straight-edged. Unlike most of the S-125's structure, the rear control surfaces were dural-framed.

The S-125's landing gear was conventional, with a pair of independent, shock-absorbing legs fixed to the wing spars and carrying the landing wheels on short axles at their inverted Y-form ends. Forward-reaching trouser fairings from the wing underside came almost to the ground, showing less than half the wheels; these had brakes that were foot-operated from the edges of the rudder pedals, allowing independent or collective use of brakes and rudder on the ground. The tailwheel was steel-sprung, pneumatically damped and could freely swivel through 360°.

Operational history

The date of the S-125's first flight in early 1937 is not known exactly but it ended in a crash which left it badly damaged. After that, the assets of Ben Jones, Inc. moved between several companies until the aircraft was rebuilt as the White S-125. Nothing more is known of it.

Variants
S-125  C4 engine
S-150  C4S supercharged engine. Not flown.

Specifications (S-125)

References

Single-engined tractor aircraft
Monoplanes
Low-wing aircraft
1930s United States sport aircraft
Aircraft first flown in 1937